"Life Goes On" is a song by American singer-songwriter Oliver Tree. It was released on May 28, 2021, through Atlantic Records, as the second single from the deluxe version of his debut studio album, Ugly Is Beautiful (2020). Tree and DJ Getter co-wrote and produced "Life Goes On".

Content
Tree stated in an interview that "Life Goes On" is about "a problematic relationship where one person treats the other person badly. shouldn't waste time on toxic people". The song is written in the key of C major, with a tempo of 80 beats per minute. The song is also performed in double time.

Music videos 
A music video for "Life Goes On" was directed by Tree and uploaded to his official YouTube channel on May 28, 2021. Additionally, Tree would release a lyric video to his official YouTube channel on September 10, 2021, just four months later.

A remix of the song, along with a music video, which featured American rappers Trippie Redd and Ski Mask the Slump God was released on December 17, 2021, along with a appearance from the Island Boys.

Charts

Weekly charts

Year-end charts

Certifications

Release history

References

2021 singles
2021 songs
Atlantic Records singles
Oliver Tree songs